Zucchius is a prominent lunar impact crater located near the southwestern limb. Because of its location the crater appears oblong-shaped due to foreshortening. It lies just to the south-southwest of the crater Segner, and northeast of the much larger walled plain Bailly. To the southeast is Bettinus, a formation only slightly larger than Zucchius.

The crater rim is symmetrical and shows little significant wear from impacts. The inner wall is terraced, and there is a group of small central peaks that forms a curving arc around the middle of the floor, making it a complex crater.  Due to its ray system, Zucchius is mapped as part of the Copernican System.

To the northeast of Zucchius is the Schiller-Zucchius Basin, a Pre-Nectarian basin (peak ring basin). This basin has received the unofficial designation 'Schiller Annular Plain' among lunar observers.

Satellite craters
By convention these features are identified on lunar maps by placing the letter on the side of the crater midpoint that is closest to Zucchius.

References

External links
 

Impact craters on the Moon